Margaret Avery is an American actress and singer. She began her career appearing on stage and later had starring roles in films including Cool Breeze (1972), Which Way Is Up? (1977), Scott Joplin (1977), and The Fish That Saved Pittsburgh (1979).

Avery is best known for her performance as Shug Avery in the 1985 period drama film The Color Purple for which she was nominated for an Academy Award for Best Actress in a Supporting Role. She continued appearing in films including Blueberry Hill (1988), White Man's Burden (1995), Welcome Home Roscoe Jenkins (2008), Meet the Browns (2008), and Proud Mary (2018). From 2013 to 2019, Avery starred as Helen Patterson, lead character's mother, in the BET drama series Being Mary Jane.

Early life
Margaret Avery was born in Mangum, Oklahoma and raised in San Diego, California, where she attended Point Loma High School. She then attended San Francisco State University where, in 1965, she earned a degree in education. While working as a substitute teacher in Los Angeles, Avery began making singing and acting appearances.

Career
Among the plays Avery appeared in were Revolution and The Sistuhs. In 1972, she received the Los Angeles Drama Critics Circle Award for Outstanding Performance by an Actress for her performance in Does a Tiger Wear a Necktie?. In the television movie Something Evil (1972), a horror story with Sandy Dennis and Darren McGavin, Avery was directed by Steven Spielberg. That same year she made her theatrical motion picture debut as Lark in the crime film Cool Breeze with Thalmus Rasulala and Judy Pace. In this blaxploitation remake of The Asphalt Jungle, Avery played the Marilyn Monroe part. The following year she played a prostitute in Magnum Force, the second in the series of Dirty Harry films starring Clint Eastwood, in which her character was murdered by her pimp. The character was killed through the pouring drain cleaner down the victim's throat which was said to have inspired the notorious Hi-Fi Murders case in 1974.

Avery received NAACP Image Awards for her performance in the 1976 film Louis Armstrong - Chicago Style. In the 1977 film Which Way Is Up?, directed by Michael Schultz, Avery gave a comedic performance as Annie Mae, the wife of Richard Pryor's character. That same year, she played Belle Joplin, wife of the ragtime composer Scott Joplin, opposite Billy Dee Williams in the title role in film Scott Joplin, receiving NAACP Image Award for Outstanding Actress in a Motion Picture nomination. In 1979, she appeared in The Fish That Saved Pittsburgh. 

Avery made guest appearances on many television series during 1970s and 1980s , including The New Dick Van Dyke Show, Kojak, Marcus Welby, M.D., Sanford and Son, Kolchak: The Night Stalker, The Rookies, five appearances on Harry O, A.E.S. Hudson Street, T. J. Hooker, Murder, She Wrote, Miami Vice, Spenser: For Hire, and The Cosby Show.

In 1985, Avery played the role of Shug Avery in the period drama film The Color Purple directed by Steven Spielberg. Her performance in this screen adaptation of Alice Walker's prize-winning novel The Color Purple was nominated for an Academy Award for Best Supporting Actress. Avery was the last character to be cast in the film. In her Essence interview she said: "I had been singing in Indonesia and came back to find all these messages on my answering service from other actors saying, ‘Hey Margaret, you’ve got to get your agent on The Color Purple.’ My agent at the time had tried to get me an audition but was told that I wasn’t right for the role— they wanted a singer, not an actor. I knew Ruben Cannon, who was casting at that time, because he’d cast me in so many television things before, so I wrote him a note. I  had read the book and was drawn to Shug Avery. Ruben allowed me to put my reading for the role on tape. Because of him I was able to get my work seen by Steven Spielberg. Alice Walker said that she had seen a lot of tapes of other actors but when my audition came up she just kind of woke up. She couldn’t take her eyes off me. That was like a beautiful introduction to getting the role."

After The Color Purple and Oscar nomination, Avery did not work on film or television for two years. She said "The fact that I didn’t work for a couple years after The Color Purple is not unique. It not only happens to White actors sometimes, but with Black actors, too; but more so for women of color. At the time, most women of color who were in the business were limited to Black film; whereas my counterpart like Danny Glover, went on to Lethal Weapon One, Two, and Three. He didn’t have to be limited to a Black film; he didn’t have to be married to a family, or related to somebody, like we women have to. I didn’t work for a couple years after The Color Purple. What saved me was the college lecture circuit. I kind of got a backlash for two reasons: one, no one would even think of me for a television role because they figured she’s too big to do TV now. That was the pattern."
 
In 1988, Avery starred in the period drama film Blueberry Hill, and the following year appeared in action film Riverbend. In 1990, she appeared in The Return of Superfly, another blaxploitation film. In 1992, Avery starred in the ABC miniseries The Jacksons: An American Dream as Martha Scruse, mother of Katherine Jackson, who was played by Angela Bassett. In 1995, she co-starred opposite Harry Belafonte in the drama film White Man's Burden. The following years, she guest-starred on number of television series, including Walker, Texas Ranger, JAG, and Bones. In 2008, Avery played Mama Jenkins in Welcome Home Roscoe Jenkins, opposite Martin Lawrence and James Earl Jones, and Sarah Brown in Tyler Perry's Meet the Browns, which also stars Angela Bassett.

From 2013 to 2019, Avery played the role of Helen Patterson in the BET drama series, Being Mary Jane. She played Taraji P. Henson' mother in the 2018 action film Proud Mary. She later guest-starred on Grey's Anatomy and Better Things.

Personal life
In January 1974, Margaret Avery married Robert Gordon Hunt. They have one daughter, Aisha Hunt, and divorced in 1980. 

Margaret Avery lives in Los Angeles, and remains active in the show business. While continuing to act, she also works with at-risk teenagers and battered women of the Greater Los Angeles Area. She was interviewed by Melody Trice on The Melody Trice Show about her activism.

Filmography

Film

Television

References

External links

Actresses from San Diego
20th-century African-American women singers
Musicians from San Diego
Point Loma High School alumni
San Francisco State University alumni
Living people
People from Mangum, Oklahoma
Actresses from Oklahoma
African-American actresses
American television actresses
American film actresses
American stage actresses
20th-century American actresses
21st-century American actresses
Singers from California
21st-century African-American women
21st-century African-American people
Year of birth missing (living people)